× Cambria is a commercial name for intergeneric hybrids among the following genera of orchids of the family Orchidaceae, subfamily Epidendroideae, tribe Cymbidieae and subtribe Oncidiinae:
 Odontoglossum  Kunth 1816
 Oncidium Sw.
 Miltonia Lindl. 1837
 Cochlioda Lindl. 1853 
 Brassia R. Br. 1813

The first orchid hybrid among  Odontoglossum crispum × Miltonia × Cochlioda noetzliana was obtained  in 1911 by  Mr. Charles Vuylsteke and was called × Vuylstekeara in his honor. About ten years later by crossbreeding × Vuylstekeara and Odontoglossum Clonius appeared × Vuylstekeara Cambria Plush, awarded by the Royal Horticultural Society and by the American Orchid Society. From that moment many spectacular hybrids have been created and the Cambria term is nowadays  used  for a large group of hybrid orchids with beautiful spotted and brightly coloured flowers.

In recent publications (Genera Orchidacearum (AM Pridgeon, PJ Cribb, FN Rasmussen, MW Chase)) the Orchid genera Cochlioda and Odontoglossum are merged into Oncidium. As a result the nothogenus × Cambria should be replaced by × Aliceara (a combination of Miltonia, Oncidium and Brassia).

Description 
The Cambria orchids are equipped with quite stretched pseudobulbs, from which the leaves and the long floral stem develop. The inflorescences have from three to seven flowers. At the end of the flowering period the orchid produces a new pseudobulb  that can create a new plant.

These evergreen orchids may have flowers with a large variety of colors and shapes. Usually they are big and display magnificent colors, very vibrant, dark red, purple or orange, variously speckled with white. The Cambria orchids flourish in Spring, Summer and Autumn, depending on environmental conditions. These plants are widespread and very easy to grow and to breed.

Gallery

References 

Genera Orchidacearum (AM Pridgeon, PJ Cribb, FN Rasmussen, MW Chase )

External links 
 Cambria Orchids
 The Hybrid Cambria Orchid
 About the origin of the Vuylstekeara: Dirk Podevijn (ed.), Charles Vuylsteke,sr. en jr., fine-fleur van de Belgische sierteelt (1867-1937), Gent, 1995.

Oncidiinae
Orchid nothogenera
Historically recognized angiosperm taxa